Cranberry Creek is a stream in the U.S. state of Ohio.

Cranberry Creek was named for the cranberries which once grew along its course.

See also
List of rivers of Ohio

References

Rivers of Allen County, Ohio
Rivers of Putnam County, Ohio
Rivers of Ohio